The life of Joseph Smith, Jr. from 1831 to 1834, when he was 26–29 years old, covers the period of time from when Smith moved with his family to Kirtland, Ohio, in 1831, to his return from Zion's Camp in 1834. By 1831, Smith had already translated the Book of Mormon, and established the Latter Day Saint movement. He had founded it as the Church of Christ, but was eventually instructed by revelation to change its name to the Church of Jesus Christ of Latter Day Saints.

Life in Kirtland, Ohio
After receiving what Smith described as revelations, Smith and his wife Emma Hale Smith moved to Kirtland, Ohio, early in 1831, arriving about February 3rd. They lived with Isaac Morley's family while a house was built for them on the Morley farm. Many of Smith's followers and associates settled in Kirtland, and also in Jackson County, Missouri, where Smith said he was instructed by revelation to build Zion.

The early church grew rapidly.

Early conflicts
Due to the controversy which followed Smith, he was not to escape persecution for long.

According to recorded accounts of the event, the mob broke down the front door, took Smith's oldest surviving adopted child from his arms, dragged Smith from the room, leaving his exposed child on a trundle bed and forcing Emma and the others from the house, the mob threatening her with rape and murder. The child was knocked off the bed onto the floor in the doorway of the home as Smith was forcibly removed from his home. The child died from exposure (many accounts say pneumonia) five days after the event  from the condition that doctors said he developed the night of the mob violence.

The historian Fawn Brodie references an account that one of John Johnson's sons, Eli, meant to punish Smith by having him castrated for an intimacy with his teenage sister, Nancy Marinda Johnson, but author Bushman disputes this. He feels a more probable motivation is recorded by Symonds Ryder, a participant in the event, who felt Smith was plotting to take property from members of the community and a company of citizens violently warned Smith that they would not accept those actions.

Zion's Camp

As early as 1831, Smith had stated that the City of Zion would be built in Jackson County, Missouri, with Independence as the centerplace for Zion. Many Latter Day Saints began to gather to that area. Many local non-Mormons in Jackson County became alarmed at the movement's rapid growth. Forming vigilante groups, many burned Latter Day Saint homes and destroyed the church print shop. Many Latter Day Saints were threatened and abused and by 1833, nearly all had fled from the county for their safety. The Mormon refugees then settled temporarily in neighboring counties, including Clay County in particular.

In 1834, Smith called for a militia to be raised in Kirtland which would then march to Missouri and "redeem Zion." About 200 men and a number of women and children volunteered to join this militia which became known as "Zion's Camp." It was agreed that Smith would be the leader of the group.

Zion's Camp left Kirtland on May 4, 1834. They had marched across Indiana and Illinois Rivers, reached the Mississippi River, and entered Missouri by June 4. They crossed most of the state by the end of June and news of their approach caused some alarm among non-Mormons in Jackson and Clay Counties. Attempts to negotiate a return of the Latter Day Saints to Jackson County proved fruitless, but Smith decided to disband Zion's Camp, rather than attempt to "redeem Zion" by force. Many members of the camp subsequently became ill with cholera.

Although the Latter Day Saints failed to achieve their goal of returning to Jackson County, Missouri's legislature later approved a compromise which set aside the new county of Caldwell specifically for their settlement in 1836.

While the march failed to return Latter Day Saint property, many of its participants became committed loyalists in the movement. When Smith returned to Kirtland, he organized the Quorum of the Twelve Apostles, and the First Quorum of the Seventy, choosing primarily men who had served in Zion's Camp.

Temple in Kirtland

In Kirtland, the church's first temple was built. Work was begun in 1833, and the temple was dedicated in 1836. At and around the dedication, many extraordinary events were reported: appearances by Jesus, Moses, Elijah, Elias, and numerous angels; speaking and singing, often with translations; prophesying; and other spiritual experiences. Some Mormons believed that Jesus' Millennial reign had come.

Notes

References

 
 
 

History of the Latter Day Saint movement
Joseph Smith
Smith, Joseph 1831 to 1834
1831 beginnings
1834 endings